The R129 road is a regional road in Fingal, Dublin, Ireland.

The official description of the R129 from the Roads Act 1993 (Classification of Regional Roads) Order 2012 reads:

R129: Coldwinters - Wyanstown, County Dublin

Between its junction with R132 at Coldwinters and its junction with R122 at Wyanstown via Thomondstown, Grange, Ballyboghill, Murragh and Leastown all in the county of Fingal..

See also
Roads in Ireland
National primary road
National secondary road
Regional road

References

Regional roads in the Republic of Ireland
Roads in Fingal